The 2007 Craven District Council election took place on 3 May 2007 to elect members of Craven District Council in North Yorkshire, England. One third of the council was up for election and the council stayed under no overall control.

After the election, the composition of the council was
Conservative 13
Independent 11
Liberal Democrats 6

Background
Before the election the council was run by an alliance between the 11 independents and the 6 Liberal Democrats, while the 13 Conservative councillors were in opposition. 10 seats were contested at the election with the Conservatives needing to make at least 2 gains to take control.

Candidates at the election included Conservative candidates in every ward, while there were no candidates from the Labour party. The British National Party meanwhile stood their first candidate in an election for Craven council in Skipton South.

Election result
There was no change to the party balance on the council, after the Conservatives gained a seat from an independent, but also lost a seat to another independent candidate. The Conservative gain came in Skipton South, where they defeated the vice-chairman of the council, Mike Hill, while they lost Bentham to an independent by 5 votes after 3 recounts.

Ward results

By-elections between 2007 and 2008
A by-election was held in Cowling on 12 July 2007 after independent councillor John Alderson resigned from the council after moving away from the area. The seat was gained for the Conservatives by Jan Ackroyd with a majority of 215 votes over Craven Ratepayers' Action Group candidate Alan Perrow.

References

2007
2007 English local elections
2000s in North Yorkshire